Robert Moelwyn Jones, CBE (27 January 1955 – 1 July 2014) was a British Labour politician who served as a member of Wolverhampton City Council from 1980 to 2013 and as the West Midlands Police and Crime Commissioner in England from 2013-14.

He was elected West Midlands Police and Crime Commissioner on 15 November 2012 and was the first person to hold the post, from 8 January 2013 until his death on 1 July 2014.

Early career
Jones was born in Wolverhampton and studied for a degree in Public Administration at the University of Nottingham.

Jones served as a Labour Councillor for Blakenhall Ward on Wolverhampton City Council from 1 May 1980 to 2013. Jones was a Cabinet member for Leisure and Community Safety and served on various scrutiny boards. He also held responsibilities as Chair of Education, Finance, Youth Committees and many others on the City Council.

He was the Labour Party candidate for Wolverhampton South West in the 1983 general election, but was defeated by Conservative incumbent Nicholas Budgen, taking 13,694 votes (27.5%) to Budgen's 25,214 votes (50.6%).

He was a member of the West Midlands Police Authority from 1986 to 2012, and chaired the Authority from 1995 to 2000. He also served as a member of the Association of Police Authorities (APA) where he was Deputy Chairman from 2004 to 2005 and Chairman from 2005 to 2009. He was also a member of the National Policing Board, National Criminal Justice Board, and Senior Appointment Panel.

Jones served as Chair of Wolverhampton Community Safety Partnership. He was also a member of the service authorities for the National Crime Squad (NCS) and National Criminal Intelligence Service (NCIS) and chaired the disciplinary committee for both authorities. In 2010 Jones was appointed a CBE for "services to policing".

Jones served as a non-executive director of the Black Country Cluster PCT Boards and chaired various other local community organisations and trusts. He was also the Campaigning Strategy Director for the Campaign for Real Ale.

West Midlands Police and Crime Commissioner

In November 2012, Jones was elected as Police and Crime Commissioner (PCC) for the West Midlands. PCCs replaced Police Authorities in all forces across England and Wales outside the Met. Turnout in the West Midlands was 238,384 (12%), with Jones beating the Conservative Party candidate, Matt Bennett, winning 117,388 votes in total. Jones assumed office on 22 November 2012. He resigned as a Councillor in 2013.

The following table shows the breakdown of the election results for the West Midlands:

From his Candidate Statement, key pledges made by Jones included: introducing community led Local Policing Boards which would establish local policing priorities and be engaged in local police commander appointments; retaining PCSOs; bringing police contact points into council and other community buildings; and redressing the financial settlement allocated to West Midlands Police by the government, which was seen as poor in comparison to that given to other forces.

Jones appointed Nechells councillor Yvonne Mosquito as his deputy shortly after taking office.

His first act in the job was to scrap the West Midlands Police Authority's plans to explore private partnerships that would have seen some services provided by private contractors. Jones stated that he would consider selling the force HQ, Lloyd House, if "the right financial offer came along".

In an article for The Guardian in September 2013, Jones wrote that PCCs should be scrapped, saying: "after nine months in the job, I see no evidence that police and crime commissioners are an improvement on the previous police authorities." He explained that "PCCs have weaker appointment and dismissal powers than police authorities, having lost the ability to appoint and dismiss deputy and assistant chief constables. Despite only having powers over chief constables, a lot is happening that causes concern", adding that, "short-term political considerations have greater weight than long-term sustainability in many PCC policing budgets. This is a by-product of political immediacy where directly elected politicians want to see eye-catching gimmicks for the electorate." He concluded that "the easy way to be a PCC is to not make any unpopular decisions about having the resources to hold the force to account, and act like a ceremonial mayor – cutting ribbons, taking the photo opportunities and launching a few initiatives. Everything else is left to the chief constable in the hope that he or she doesn't mess up or, more cynically, in the belief that you can get away with sacking them and passing on the blame before the next election."

Death

Jones died suddenly in his sleep on 1 July 2014. He was 59 years old. A memorial event was held on 23 July, at Wolverhampton Civic Hall. A by-election to replace him as PCC was held on 21 August. It was won by Labour candidate David Jamieson.

References

External links

 West Midlands Police and Crime Commissioner website
 Jones' Candidate Statement for West Midlands Police and Crime Commissioner
 Jones' councillor profile on Wolverhampton City Council website

2014 deaths
1955 births
Alumni of the University of Nottingham
Commanders of the Order of the British Empire
Councillors in Wolverhampton
Labour Party (UK) councillors
Police and crime commissioners of West Midlands
Labour Party police and crime commissioners